Oran District No. 22 Schoolhouse is a historic one-room school building located at Oran in Onondaga County, New York.  It is a one-story frame building on a stone foundation, 25 feet wide and 41 feet deep.  It was originally built in the 1830s as a store and post office.  It was remodeled sometime before the 1860s for use as a school.  It ceased being used as a school in 1951 and is now used as a community center.

It was listed on the National Register of Historic Places in 1998.

References

One-room schoolhouses in New York (state)
Schoolhouses in the United States
School buildings on the National Register of Historic Places in New York (state)
Federal architecture in New York (state)
School buildings completed in 1830
Buildings and structures in Onondaga County, New York
1830 establishments in New York (state)
National Register of Historic Places in Onondaga County, New York